Galleria Office Towers is an office complex located on the site of The Galleria in the Uptown district of Houston, Texas, United States. The buildings, consisting of the Galleria Tower I, Galleria Tower II, and the Galleria Financial Center, are managed by Colville Office Properties.

2700 Post Oak Boulevard.
5051 Westheimer Road.

Tenants
Galleria Tower I
 CIGNA (Suite 700)
 Zehl & Associates, PC Suite 1120

Galleria Tower II
 PEAK Performance Group Suite 1111 www.peakpg.com

Gallery

See also

 The Galleria
 Uptown Houston

References

External links
 Galleria Office Towers

Skyscraper office buildings in Houston
Buildings and structures in Houston